Boetius de Dacia, OP (also spelled Boethius de Dacia) was a 13th-century Danish philosopher.

Name
The rendering of his name Danske Bo ("Bo the Dane") into Medieval Latin as Boetius de Dacia stems from the fact that the toponym Dania, meaning Denmark, was occasionally confused with Dacia during the Middle Ages.

Life and accomplishments
Boetius was born in the first half of the 13th century.  Not much is known of his early life. The attempt to connect him to known persons from Denmark or Sweden has been unsuccessful. All that is known is that he went to France to teach philosophy at the University of Paris. At the university, he associated with Siger of Brabant. He continued to teach for some time as arts masters rather than quickly moving on to study in the theology faculty or finding non-academic employment. He shared this unusual career path with Siger and others like Roger Bacon and Jean Buridan. He was condemned by Stephen Tempier in 1277 for being a leading member of the Averroist movement. Boetius fled Paris with Siger and appealed to Pope Nicholas III. He was detained at the pontifical curia at Orvieto. He went on to join the Dominicans in Denmark.

Boetius was a follower of Aristotle and Averroes. He wrote on logic, natural philosophy, metaphysics, and ethics, though some of his works have not survived. His central position was that philosophy had to follow where the arguments led, regardless of their conflict with religious faith. For him, philosophy was the supreme human activity, and in this world only philosophers attained wisdom. In his book On the Highest Good, or On the Life of the Philosopher he offers a fervently Aristotelian description of man's highest good as the rational contemplation of truth and virtue. Among the controversial conclusions that he reached are the impossibility of creation ex nihilo, the eternity of the world and of the human race, and that there could be no resurrection of the dead.

Despite his radical views, Boetius remained a Christian; he attempted to reconcile his religious beliefs with his philosophical positions by assigning the investigation of the world and of human nature to philosophy, while to religion he assigned supernatural revelation and divine miracles. He was condemned for holding the doctrine of "double truth", though he was careful to avoid calling philosophical conclusions that ran contrary to religion true simpliciter: in each branch of knowledge, one must be careful to qualify one's conclusions. The conclusions that the philosopher reaches are true "according to natural causes and principles" (De Aeternitate Mundi, p. 351).

Works and translations
 Boethii Daci Opera: 
 Modi significandi sive quaestiones super Priscianum maiorem, edited by John Pinborg & Henry Roos with the collaboration of Severino Skovgaard Jensen, Hauniae (Copenhague), G. E. C. Gad, Corpus Philosophorum Danicorum Medii Aevi, 4, 1969.
 Quaestiones de generatione et corruptione – Quaestiones super libros physicorum, edited by Géza Sajó,  Hauniae (Copenhague), G. E. C. Gad, Corpus Philosophorum Danicorum Medii Aevi, 5, 1976.
 Topica – Opuscola, Pars 1. Quaestiones super Librum Topicorum, edited by Nicolas George Green-Pedersen and John Pinborg; Pars 2. Opuscula: De aeternitate mundi. De summo bono. De somniis, edited by Nicolas George Green-Pedersen, Hauniae (Copenhague), G. E. C. Gad, Corpus Philosophorum Danicorum Medii Aevi, 6, 1976.
 Quaestiones super IV Meteorologicorum, edited by Gianfranco Fioravanti, Hauniae (Copenhague), G. E. C. Gad, Corpus Philosophorum Danicorum Medii Aevi, 8, 1979.
 Boethius of Dacia, On the Supreme Good; on the Eternity of the World; on Dreams. Edited by John F. Wippel, Mediaeval Sources in Translation. Toronto, Ont. Canada: Pontifical Institute of Mediaeval Studies, 1987.
 Boetius of Dacia, "The Sophisma 'Every Man Is of Necessity an Animal'", in Norman Kretzmann and Eleonore Stump [edd. & trans.] The Cambridge Translations of Medieval Philosophical texts. Volume One: Logic and the Philosophy of Language (1988, Cambridge University Press)

Notes

References
 G. L. Bursill-Hall, Speculative Grammars of the Middle Ages: The Doctrine of the partes orationis of the Modistae, Mouton: The Hague, 1971.
 John Marenbon, Later Medieval Philosophy (1150–1350), New York: Routledge, 1991 .
 Armand A. Maurer, "Boetius of Dacia", in The Encyclopedia of Philosophy, ed. Paul Edwards, Collier Macmillan, 1967.

External links
 

Scholastic philosophers
Danish philosophers
Academic staff of the University of Paris
13th-century philosophers
13th-century births
Year of death unknown
Latin commentators on Aristotle
13th-century Latin writers